Vinko Međimorec (born 1 June 1996) is a Croatian footballer who plays as a defender for Akritas Chlorakas.

Club career
On 8 September 2020, Međimorec signed a 1+1 year contract with Azerbaijan Premier League side Gabala FK. On 22 June 2021, Gabala confirmed that Međimorec had left the club with the expiration of his contract.

Career statistics

Club

Honours
Slaven Belupo
Croatian Cup runner-up: 2015–16

References

External links
 
 

1996 births
Living people
Sportspeople from Koprivnica
Association football defenders
Croatian footballers
NK Koprivnica players
NK Slaven Belupo players
Gabala FC players
FC UTA Arad players
Karmiotissa FC players
Croatian Football League players
Azerbaijan Premier League players
Liga I players
Cypriot First Division players
Croatian expatriate footballers
Expatriate footballers in Azerbaijan
Croatian expatriate sportspeople in Azerbaijan
Expatriate footballers in Romania
Croatian expatriate sportspeople in Romania
Expatriate footballers in Cyprus
Croatian expatriate sportspeople in Cyprus